Ogilby's duiker (Cephalophus ogilbyi) is a small antelope found in Sierra Leone, Liberia, Ghana, southeastern Nigeria, Bioko Island and possibly Gabon. No subspecies are recognized. It is named after Irish zoologist William Ogilby. 

The two former subspecies, the white-legged duiker Cephalophus crusalbum and the Brooke's duiker Cephalophus brookei, are considered as distinct species since 2011.

They vary in color from chestnut to mahogany to deep brown, and have massive hindquarters typical of duikers.

Ogilby's duikers live mainly in high-altitude rainforests, where they feed mainly on fallen fruit.

The total population is estimated at 12,000 individuals.

References

External links

ultimateungulate.com

Ogilby's duiker
Mammals of West Africa
Fauna of Bioko
Ogilby's duiker